Klaus Felix von Amsberg (1 September 1890 – 19 December 1953) was a member of the German Niederer Adel (lower nobility) and father of Prince Claus of the Netherlands, who was the father of King Willem-Alexander of the Netherlands, thus making him the paternal grandfather of the current Dutch monarch.

Early life
He was born at Rehna, Mecklenburg-Schwerin, German Empire (now Mecklenburg-Vorpommern, Germany), the first child of Wilhelm von Amsberg (1856–1929), by his marriage to Elise von Vieregg (1866–1951), member of an old aristocratic family.

In World War I he fought as a German officer in the Imperial German Army at the side of General Paul von Lettow-Vorbeck in German East Africa.

Claus was from 1917 the steward of an estate after a failed venture in Africa as a planter.

In 1928 he moved with his family to the Tanganyika Territory (now Tanzania), where he remained during the outbreak of World War II as the manager of an Anglo-German tea and sisal plantation. He returned to Germany in 1947.

Marriage
Claus married on 4 September 1924 at Hitzacker to Baroness Gösta von dem Bussche-Haddenhausen (26 January 1902 – 13 June 1996), daughter of Baron Georg von dem Bussche-Haddenhausen (1869–1923) and Baroness Gabriele von dem Bussche-Ippenburg (1877–1973).

Together they had six daughters and one son:
Sigrid von Amsberg (26 June 1925 – 1 April 2018), married in 1952 to Ascan-Bernd Jencquel (17 August 1913 – 4 November 2003), had issue.
Claus von Amsberg (6 September 1926 – 6 October 2002), married in 1966 to Beatrix of the Netherlands (b. 31 January 1938), had issue. 
Rixa von Amsberg (18 November 1927 – 6 January 2010), married to Peter Ahrend (17 April 1920 – 2011), no issue.
Margit von Amsberg (16 October 1930 – 1988), married in 1964 to Ernst Grubitz (14 April 1931 – 5 June 2009), had issue. 
Barbara von Amsberg (b. 16 October 1930), married in 1963 to Günther Haarhaus (22 October 1921 – 9 February 2007), had issue.
Theda von Amsberg (b. 30 June 1939), married in 1966 to Baron Karl von Friesen (b. 1933), had issue.
Christina von Amsberg (b. 20 January 1945), married in 1971 to Baron Hans Hubertus von der Recke (b. 1942), had issue.

He died, aged 63, in Jasebeck, West Germany, of a heart attack.

Ancestry

Notes and sources
thePeerage.com - Claus von Amsberg
Die Ahnen Claus Georg von Amsberg, Limburg a.d.Lahn, 1966, Euler, F. W., Reference: 2
Het huwelijk van H.K.H.Prinses Beatrix, Zaltbommel, 1966, Banning, Mr. Dr. Drs. J. P. D. van, Reference: 65

References 

1890 births
1953 deaths
People from Nordwestmecklenburg
Claus Felix von Amsberg